Frederick Arthur Jones (21 October 1922 – December 1989) was an English footballer who played as a right-back for Port Vale in the Football League shortly after World War II.

Career
Jones played for South Liverpool, before joining Port Vale in June 1946. He made twelve Third Division South appearances in the 1946–47 season, and scored one goal in a 5–3 defeat to Leyton Orient at Brisbane Road on 5 April. At the end of the season manager Gordon Hodgson allowed him to leave The Old Recreation Ground.

Career statistics
Source:

References

1922 births
1989 deaths
Footballers from Stoke-on-Trent
English footballers
Association football fullbacks
South Liverpool F.C. players
Port Vale F.C. players
English Football League players